Vittorio Congia (4 November 1930 – 26 November 2019) was an Italian film actor and dubber. He appeared in 40 films between 1957 and 1978. He was born in Iglesias, Sardinia, Italy.

Selected filmography
 La Bottega del Caffè (1960)
 Sua Eccellenza si fermò a mangiare (1961)
 5 marines per 100 ragazze (1962)
 Shivers in Summer (1963)
 Obiettivo ragazze (1963)
 Gli amanti latini (1965)
 Rita the Mosquito (1966)
 The Cat o' Nine Tails (1971)

References

External links

1930 births
2019 deaths
Italian male film actors
Italian male television actors
Italian male stage actors
Italian male voice actors
Italian male radio actors
20th-century Italian male actors
21st-century Italian male actors